Misbahul Islam Faruqi (18 October 1923 – 14 November 1976) was a Pakistani writer, editor, translator, journalist, thinker and military officer in the British Indian Army.

He was born on 18 October 1923, in Meerut. He received BA from Aligarh Muslim University in 1943. He joined the British Indian Army during World War II and was promoted to the rank of Subedar. Subedar Farooqi was fluent in both Urdu and English.

He died on 14 November 1976 in Lahore and was buried there.

Literary works
He was the editor of the Lahore daily Tasneem and Qasid. He was also in charge of the broadcasting department of the Tehreek-e-Islami. He was a regular contributor to Chirag-e-Rah Karachi. His books also translated The Protocols of the Elders of Zion with the title Jewish conspiracy and the Muslim world in the late 1960s and republished in 2001.

References

1923 births
1976 deaths
Pakistani male writers
Pakistani male journalists
People from Meerut
People from Lahore
Aligarh Muslim University alumni
Protocols of the Elders of Zion
Journalists from Lahore
Writers from Lahore